Chahar Tall-e Mir Mohammad Fasiyeh (also Romanized as Chahār Tall-e Mīr Moḩammad Faṣīyeḥ; also known as Chahār Tall) is a village in Zilayi Rural District, Margown District, Boyer-Ahmad County, Kohgiluyeh and Boyer-Ahmad Province, Iran. At the 2006 census, its population was 35, in 9 families.

References 

Populated places in Boyer-Ahmad County